Rudravaram is a village in  Rudravaram mandal of Nandyal district of Andhra Pradesh, India.

The village was plundered in July 1846 by an armed group led by Uyyalawada Narasimha Reddy.

References

Villages in Nandyal district